Beveridge is an unincorporated community in Inyo County, California. It lies at an elevation of 5587 feet (1703 m). Beveridge began as a mining town  The name honors John Beveridge. 

Beveridge gold mining camp, which existed between the 1880s and the 1910s, and had a post office from 1881 to 1882, was within Beveridge Canyon at the eastern side of the Inyo Mountains. There are remnants of cabins, mining equipment, and rock-built structures. Access is from the west along the Beverage Canyon Trail, suitable only for hiking. The mine is listed in the U.S. Geological Survey Mineral Resources Data System (MRDS) as "Beveridge Canyon Mn No. 12".

References

Unincorporated communities in Inyo County, California
Ghost towns in Inyo County, California